John Washington McKinney House was a historic home located near Charlotte, Mecklenburg County, North Carolina.  The I-house was built in the 1870s, and was remodeled in the Colonial Revival style about 1916.  It was a two-story, double pile farmhouse with a slate hipped roof and one-story rear kitchen ell.  Also on the property were a contributing wellhouse / dairy (c. 1916) and smokehouse (c. 1916).  It has been demolished.

It was listed on the National Register of Historic Places in 1991.

References

Houses on the National Register of Historic Places in North Carolina
Colonial Revival architecture in North Carolina
Houses completed in 1916
Houses in Charlotte, North Carolina
National Register of Historic Places in Mecklenburg County, North Carolina